Viking is a city in Marshall County, Minnesota, United States. The population was 79 at the 2020 census.

History
A post office called Viking has been in operation since 1890. The city was named after the Vikings.

Geography

Demographics

2010 census
As of the census of 2010, there were 104 people, 43 households, and 31 families living in the city. The racial makeup of the city was 96.2% White and 3.8% from two or more races. Hispanic or Latino of any race were 1.9% of the population.

There were 43 households, of which 37.2% had children under the age of 18 living with them, 48.8% were married couples living together, 20.9% had a female householder with no husband present, 2.3% had a male householder with no wife present, and 27.9% were non-families. 25.6% of all households were made up of individuals, and 4.7% had someone living alone who was 65 years of age or older. The average household size was 2.42 and the average family size was 2.81.

The median age in the city was 42 years. 30.8% of residents were under the age of 18; 1.9% were between the ages of 18 and 24; 23% were from 25 to 44; 28.8% were from 45 to 64; and 15.4% were 65 years of age or older. The gender makeup of the city was 43.3% male and 56.7% female.

2000 census
As of the census of 2000, there were 92 people, 39 households, and 26 families living in the city. The racial makeup of the city was 100.00% White. Hispanic or Latino of any race were 1.09% of the population.

There were 39 households, out of which 28.2% had children under the age of 18 living with them, 59.0% were married couples living together, 7.7% had a female householder with no husband present, and 30.8% were non-families. 30.8% of all households were made up of individuals, and 17.9% had someone living alone who was 65 years of age or older. The average household size was 2.36 and the average family size was 2.96.

In the city, the population was spread out, with 28.3% under the age of 18, 4.3% from 18 to 24, 22.8% from 25 to 44, 21.7% from 45 to 64, and 22.8% who were 65 years of age or older. The median age was 42 years. For every 100 females, there were 87.8 males. For every 100 females age 18 and over, there were 100.0 males.

The median income for a household in the city was $28,750, and the median income for a family was $36,250. Males had a median income of $36,250 versus $26,250 for females. The per capita income for the city was $11,812. There were 7.7% of families and 14.3% of the population living below the poverty line, including 21.2% of under eighteens and none of those over 64.

References

External links
Community website

Cities in Marshall County, Minnesota
Cities in Minnesota